Auguste-Félix-Charles de Beaupoil, comte de Saint-Aulaire (born 13 August 1866 at Angoulême; died 26 September 1954 in Périgord) was a French aristocrat, diplomat, author and historian.

Education
The only son of Auguste de Beaupoil, comte de Saint-Aulaire, by his wife Isabelle-Epremier-Esther daughter of Amable-Félix Couturier de Vienne, he succeeded his father as head of the ancient and noble family which originated in Brittany. He was educated by Jesuits in Bordeaux before studying at Sciences Po in Paris.

Career
After joining the French Ministry of Foreign Affairs, his first diplomatic posting abroad was as Attaché in Chile, then back in France at the CCI in Marseilles, before in 1894 as Attaché in Tunis and in 1902 Chargé d'affaires in Tangiers. He then served as Minister-Counsellor in Vienna (1909–1912), before being recalled to the Quai d'Orsay upon the recommendation of General Lyautey, participating in the negotiations of the Treaty of Bucharest (1916).

After World War I, he served briefly in 1920 as French Ambassador to Madrid, where he replaced Gabriel Alapetite, before being promoted as Ambassador to the United Kingdom, serving in London until 1924.

The Comte de Saint-Aulaire retired to the Château de La Malartrie on the Dordogne where he concentrated on writing, including works about Emperor Franz-Joseph, Prince Talleyrand and Cardinal Richelieu.

He married, on 16 January 1899 in Paris, Marguérite-Henriette daughter of Count Léopold-Ferdinand Balny d'Avricourt; they had two daughters and a son, Edmond-Marie-Charles (married Marie-Gisèle-Claire-Ida Robillard de Magnanville), who succeeded him as comte de Saint-Aulaire.

Honours 
  Grand officier, Légion d'honneur
  Knight, Palmes académiques
  Knight, Sovereign Military Order of Malta
  Knight Commander, St Gregory the Great

See also 
 De Beaupoil de Saint-Aulaire family

References

External links
 www.catalogue.bnf.fr

1866 births
1954 deaths
French biographers
French Protestant ministers and clergy
French non-fiction writers
University of Paris alumni
Sciences Po alumni
French noble families
Counts of France
20th-century French diplomats
Ambassadors of France to the United Kingdom
Ambassadors of France to Spain
Grand Officiers of the Légion d'honneur
Knights of Malta
French male writers
Writers from Angoulême
Male non-fiction writers